The Chistenstein (2,473 m) is a mountain of the Plessur Alps, overlooking Küblis in the Swiss canton of Graubünden. It lies just west of the Durannapass (2,117 m).

References

External links
 Chistenstein on Hikr

Mountains of the Alps
Mountains of Switzerland
Mountains of Graubünden
Two-thousanders of Switzerland